The Sara people are a Central Sudanic ethnic group native to southern Chad, the northwestern areas of the Central African Republic, and the southern border of North Sudan. They speak the Sara languages which are a part of the Central Sudanic language family. They are also the largest ethnic group in Chad.

Sara oral histories add further details about the people. In summary, the Sara are mostly animists (veneration of nature), with a social order made up of several patrilineal clans formerly united into a single polity with a national language, national identity, and national religion. Many Sara people have retained their ethnic religion, but some have converted to Christianity and Islam.

Overview

In Chad
The Sara (Kameeni) are the largest ethnic group in the Republic of Chad, they're concentrated in the Moyen-Chari, the Logone Oriental, the Logone Occidental, and parts of the Tandjile regions. After their arrival, they continued to be the target of violent raids by northern Fulani and Arab people.

The local Muslim groups of what is now Chad, referred to the Sara as "Kirdi", with the term "Kirdi" denoting a non-Muslim person. The Muslim raiders of what is now Chad were autonomously called "Bagirmi", and this geo-political conflict between the Kirdi and the Bagirmi continued through the nineteenth century.

The French colonial empire entered the ongoing hostilities in the early twentieth century, and the Sara people became a part of the French Equatorial Africa, more specifically as part of the "le Tchad utile". The Sara society was transformed by this development, both in terms of culture such as French-based education and training, but also socio-economically because of forced labor and conscription to serve the French military during the World Wars. At the time of independence from France in 1960, the southerners of Chad were more assimilated into French institutions than the northerners. This led to their political dominance of the country after 1960. They were also a part of the civil war with populations in north and central Chad, each population aligning with a different ideology.

In the Central African Republic
The Sara people make up ten percent of the population of the Central African Republic, making it the fourth largest ethnic group in the country. They live in the northwest part of CAR.

Languages
The Sara people natively speak the Sara languages. This dialect cluster belongs to the Nilo-Saharan family.

Religion
The Sara people are mainly Christian and animist, with a minority of Muslims.

Genetics
Analysis of classic genetic markers and DNA polymorphisms by Excoffier et al. (1987) found that the Sara are most closely related to the Kunama people of Eritrea. Both populations speak languages from the Nilo-Saharan family. They are also similar to West African populations, but biologically distinct from the surrounding Cushitic and Ethiopian Semitic Afro-Asiatic-speaking groups.

Notable Sara people 
Sosthene Moguenara, Chadian-born German track and field athlete
Fidèle Moungar, Prime Minister of Chad in 1993, president of Action for Unity and Socialism
Noël Milarew Odingar, who overthrew Tombalbaye during the 1975 coup
Kalthouma Nguembang, only woman in Chadian National Assembly in 1968
François Tombalbaye, first President of Chad
 Japhet N'Doram

See also
Demographics of Chad
Demographics of the Central African Republic

References

Bibliography 
René Lemarchand, The Politics of Sara Ethnicity: A Note on the Origins of the Civil War in Chad, in: Cahiers d'Études africaines, Vol. 20, Cahier 80 (1980)
René Lemarchand, Chad: The Misadventures of the North-South Dialectic, in: African Studies Review, Vol. 29, No. 3 (Sept., 1986)
Mario Azevedo, The Human Price of Development: The Brazzaville Railroad and the Sara of Chad, in: African Studies Review, Vol. 24, No. 1 (Mar., 1981)
Mario Azevedo, Power and Slavery in Central Africa: Chad (1890-1925), in: The Journal of Negro History, Vol. 67, No. 3 (Autumn, 1982)
Robert Jaulin, La Mort Sara, Paris, 10/18, 1971 (1967)

 
Ethnic groups in Chad
Ethnic groups in the Central African Republic
French West Africa